PSCA may refer to:

 Pacific Spaceport Complex – Alaska
 PSCA (gene)
 Punjab Safe Cities Authority
 Punjab State Carrom Association